Perspectives Charter Schools is a charter school network in Chicago, Illinois. The organization was founded by Kim Day and Diana Shulla-Cose, two teachers at Chicago's Dyett Middle School.

In 1993, Day and Shulla-Cose established their own small school within Dyett. They chose the name "Perspectives" to reflect their hope of changing the way their students saw themselves and the world. In 1997, Perspectives became one of the first charter schools in Illinois.

The school moved several times over the years and was expanded into a network of schools, serving both elementary and high school students. The five current Perspectives schools are as follows:
The Rodney D. Joslin Campus, which is housed in a building designed by Perkins+Will
Perspectives Middle Academy
Perspectives High School of Technology
Perspectives Leadership Academy
Perspectives/IIT Math & Science Academy

Athletics
Professional basketball player Anthony Davis attended the Joslin campus.

References

External links
Perspectives Charter Schools

Public high schools in Chicago
Charter schools in Chicago